Aura is a small unincorporated community in Arvon Township of Baraga County in the U.S. state of Michigan.

Geography 
Situated on the Abbaye Peninsula between Keweenaw Bay and Huron Bay, this small farming settlement consisted of approximately fifteen square miles in both Arvon and L'Anse townships. Historically, the rich clay loam has been most suitable for potatoes, hay, wheat, oats, and other grains, although active farming has declined over the years.

History 
In the 1870s, the land on the Abbaye Peninsula was still mostly the property of the Chippewa Native Americans. In 1877, the Hebard and Thurberg Lumber Company leased the peninsula from the chief, David King. They built a large steam-powered sawmill the following year and established sixteen lumber camps. The principal Chippewa village, known as Pe-qua-qua-wa-ming, is now Pequaming. The mill produced up to 25 million board feet of lumber annually and employed as many as 650 men. After the death of King, his heirs sold the entire peninsula to Charles Hebard and his company. The land and the sawmill were later owned by Henry Ford.

Many jobless Finnish miners moved there to begin farming the land. The first settlers in June 1914 were Tobias Hiltunen and his family, who purchased Camp Number 3 and which had buildings in habitable condition. Other Finnish families arrived later that summer. They named the place Aura (Finnish: "Plow"), because someone had found an old plow on the land, apparently left by loggers.

A post office was opened December 19, 1921, and the first postmaster was Hilda Mytty. It was discontinued on February 1, 1974, and was a CPO until February 20, 1982.

Contemporary Aura 
Aura is best known now for the annual Aura Jamboree, a multi-day musical festival with a picnic and dance held on the third Saturday in July since 1976. Originally a fiddlers' jamboree featuring traditional music from many countries, today's music also includes folk, jazz, and bluegrass.

References

Further reading

External links 
 Aura Jamboree

Unincorporated communities in Baraga County, Michigan
Populated places established in 1914
Unincorporated communities in Michigan